Cement is a material for bonding stone or brick.

Cement may also refer to:

Materials
 Portland cement, the most common cement in modern use
 Adhesive or cement
 Cement (geology), in geology means the fine-grained minerals which bind the coarser-grained matrix in sedimentary rocks
 Cementum, a specialized bony substance covering the root of a tooth

Arts and entertainment
 Cement (novel), a 1925 Soviet novel by Fyodor Gladkov
 Cement, Chuck Mosley's post-Faith No More band, and Cement, their debut album
 Cement (Die Kreuzen album), 1991
 Cement (film), a 2000 neo-noir film directed by Adrian Pasdar
 "Cement" (song), a 1997 single by Feeder

Places
 Cement, Georgia, US
 Cement, Oklahoma, US